Gafrarium pectinatum, also known as Gafrarium tumidum, is a species of the genus Gafrarium in the family of Veneridae, order Veneroida in the bivalve class. They are edible clams. WoRMS believe the latter is the synonyms of the another one, but malocologist from Taiwan distinguish the two from the patterns of their shells

Distribution 
Mainly distributed in Japan, Taiwan (mainly at east shore of the Taiwan Strait, but also scattered along the Pacific shore), South China Sea (Hainan Island and Daya Bay, Singapore, Malaysia), as well as Phuket province of Thailand near Malaysia. Also seen in Chagos Archipelago and Seychelles of Indian Ocean. After the opening of the Suez Canal, this species was brought from the Indo-Pacific Oceans to the Red Sea as well as the Mediterranean Sea.

Consumption 
This clam is usually fried or cooked into soup.

Synonyms 

 Circe pectinata (Linnaeus, 1758)
 Circe pythinoides Tenison-Woods, 1878
 Crista pectinata (Linnaeus, 1758)
 Cytherea gibbia Lamarck, 1818
 Cytherea pectinata Lamarck, 1818
 Cytherea ranella Lamarck, 1818
 Gafrarium angulatum Röding, 1798
 Gafrarium cardiodeum Röding, 1798
 Gafrarium costatum Röding, 1798
 Gafrarium depressum Röding, 1798
 Gafrarium pectinatum pectinatum (Linnaeus, 1758)
 Gafrarium tumidum Röding, 1798
 Venus pectinata Linnaeus, 1758 (Original combination)

References

External links 

Edible molluscs
Veneridae
Molluscs described in 1758